The 7th constituency of Isère is one of ten French legislative constituencies in the Isère département.

After the 2010 redistricting of French legislative constituencies added a tenth constituency to Isère, the 7th constituency consists of the (pre-2015 cantonal re-organisation)
cantons of Beaurepaire, La Côte-Saint-André, Grand-Lemps, Roybon, Saint-Etienne-de-Saint-Geoirs, Saint-Jean-de-Bournay, Virieu and part of Roussillon.

Deputies

Election Results

2022

 
 
 
|-
| colspan="8" bgcolor="#E9E9E9"|
|-

2017

2012

2007

 
 
 
 
 
 
 
|-
| colspan="8" bgcolor="#E9E9E9"|
|-

2002

 
 
 
 
 
 
|-
| colspan="8" bgcolor="#E9E9E9"|
|-

1997

 
 
 
 
 
 
 
 
|-
| colspan="8" bgcolor="#E9E9E9"|
|-

References

7